Dolichoderus gibbifer is a species of ant in the genus Dolichoderus. Described by Emery in 1887, the species is endemic to Indonesia.

References

Dolichoderus
Hymenoptera of Asia
Insects of Indonesia
Insects described in 1887